Fishing Child (Chinese: 渔童) is a Chinese animated featurette short produced by the Shanghai Animation Film Studio. It is also referred to as "Fisher Boy".

Translation
The title in Chinese is closely translated to "Yu Tong" or the Fishing Bowl. The story supposedly takes place after the Opium War when the imperialists occupied China's sea port.

Story
An old fisherman who usually earns a living by fishing at the river risk of his own life to find this white jade fish-jar. On the fish-jar is engraved a tiny fisher boy. The fisher boy can become alive and grow and, with his fishing-rod, can hook the fish which are engraved on the bottom part of the fish-globe and which also can become alive and grow. The old man is later accused of stealing the fish jar from the pastor.

References

External links
 The film at China's Movie Database

1959 animated films
1959 films
Animated featurettes
Chinese animated short films
1950s Mandarin-language films
1959 short films